The Battle of Sangju was a battle during the Japanese invasions of Korea (1592–98). After capturing Busan and Dongnae, the Japanese army under  Konishi Yukinaga  advanced at a rapid rate of almost 20 kilometer per day towards the Joseon capital of Hanseong (present-day Seoul) .

Background
Joseon General Yi Il arrived at Sangju on 2 June with only a force of 60 cavalrymen. On receiving his formal assignment to block the Japanese advance from Busan towards Hanseomg while he was still in Gyeongsang Province, he found that his company of 300 supposedly first-rate troops consisted largely of untrained students and clerks conscripted out of government offices to replace men whose names were on the military lists, but who were either missing, already deceased, or claiming exemption due to illness. Rather than attempting to march this untrained force into battle, he took only his veterans, and hoped to recruit forces from the local garrison. On arriving in Sangju, he found that the garrison was completely depleted, as all of the soldiers had been called away to defend the provincial capital of Daegu to the south. With no soldiers, Yi decided to use grain from the government warehouses to recruit local peasants, and managed to gather a force of 900 men. These men were untrained and were little more than a mob, and Yi thought that he might have perhaps a week to train them. however, the Japanese army under Konishi Yukinaga arrived the following day.

Battle
When one of Yi's peasant conscripts brought word that the Japanese advance contingent had been spotted, Yi refused to believe it and had the man beheaded for spreading rumors. He felt that it was impossible that the Japanese could have advanced from Busan to Sangju in only ten days. However, the report was soon verified, and Yi deployed his force on a hill behind Sangju.

Konishi divided his army into two groups. The first, led by Konishi and Matsura Shigenobu took the town of Sangju without a fight. The second, consisting of 6700 men led by Sō Yoshitoshi, Ōmura Yoshiaki, and Gotō Mototsugu, headed directly to confront Yi. They approached through a forest, observed but out of range of Yi's archers. The archers failed to send warning to Yi, fearing the same fate as the man who had just been beheaded, and Yi was unaware of the Japanese approach until the vanguard emerged from the forest and shot down a scout less than a 100 meters from his position. The Japanese army then fanned out in three groups and rushed the Koreans. At 50 meters Yi's untrained forces broke and were cut down.

Aftermath
Yi managed to escape north, discarding his armor and his horse in the process. He continued through the strategic Choryong Pass, which could have been held to good effect against the Japanese, and joined his superior, General Sin Rip at Chungju.

The Japanese army continued its advance towards Chungju.

See also
Battle of Ch'ungju

Citations

Bibliography

 
 
 
 
 
 
 
 
 
 
 桑田忠親 [Kuwata, Tadachika], ed., 舊參謀本部編纂, [Kyu Sanbo Honbu], 朝鮮の役 [Chousen no Eki]　(日本の戰史 [Nihon no Senshi] Vol. 5), 1965.
 
 
 
 
 
 
 
 
 
 
 
 
  
 
 
 
 
 
 

Sangju
1592 in Asia
1592 in Japan
Sangju 1592